Achcham Thavir (Keep fear away)is a 2016 Indian Tamil-language stunt/dare reality-comedy game show, based on the U.S. TV series 'Fear Factor'. The show aired from 2 June 2016 until 4 September 2016 on Thursday to Sunday at 7:00PM IST on STAR Vijay. The show was hosted by Dhivyadharshini.  The show was won by actress Madhumila based on the final points.

Contestants

Team A

Team B

Final Results

Semi-final

Team A

Team B

Finals & Points

References

External links
official website
Star Vijay on YouTube
Star Vijay US
Star Vijay Malaysia

Star Vijay original programming
2010s Tamil-language television series
2016 Tamil-language television series debuts
2016 Tamil-language television series endings
Tamil-language game shows
Tamil-language television shows